Zafar Gohar (born 1 February 1995) is a Pakistani cricketer. He made his international debut for the Pakistan cricket team in November 2015.

Career
He made his One Day International debut for Pakistan against England on 17 November 2015.

In September 2019, he was named in Central Punjab's squad for the 2019–20 Quaid-e-Azam Trophy tournament. Following the conclusion of the final, he was named as the player of the tournament. He was retained by Central Punjab for the 2020–21 domestic season.

In October 2020, he was named in a 22-man squad of "probables" for Pakistan's home series against Zimbabwe. In November 2020, he was named in Pakistan's 35-man squad for their tour to New Zealand. In December 2020, Shadab Khan was ruled out of the first Test match due to an injury. Gohar was added to Pakistan's squad as Khan's replacement. He made his Test debut for Pakistan, against New Zealand, on 3 January 2021.

In January 2021, he was named in Pakistan's Twenty20 International (T20I) squad for their series against South Africa. In August 2021, he was signed by Gloucestershire to play for the remainder of the 2021 County Championship in England. In December 2021, he was re-signed by Gloucestershire for the 2022 season. Later the same month, he was signed by Islamabad United following the players' draft for the 2022 Pakistan Super League.

References

External links
 

1995 births
Living people
Pakistani cricketers
Pakistan Test cricketers
Pakistan One Day International cricketers
Cricketers from Lahore
Khyber Pakhtunkhwa cricketers
Lahore Blues cricketers
Lahore Qalandars cricketers
Islamabad United cricketers
Sui Southern Gas Company cricketers
Central Punjab cricketers
Gloucestershire cricketers
20th-century Pakistani people
21st-century Pakistani people
People from Lahore